Zakrzew-Kolonia may refer to the following places in Poland:
Zakrzew-Kolonia, Lublin Voivodeship (eastern Poland)
Zakrzew-Kolonia, Masovian Voivodeship (east-central Poland)